Hoàng Quý Phước (born March 24, 1993; living in Đà Nẵng) is a male Vietnamese swimmer. He holds Vietnam's records, and became the first swimmer to reach Olympic Selection Time at the Malaysian Swimming Championship 2011.  However, he failed to qualify for the Olympics.

References

External links
 

1993 births
Living people
People from Da Nang
Vietnamese male freestyle swimmers
Swimmers at the 2010 Summer Youth Olympics
Swimmers at the 2010 Asian Games
Swimmers at the 2014 Asian Games
Swimmers at the 2018 Asian Games
Swimmers at the 2016 Summer Olympics
Olympic swimmers of Vietnam
Southeast Asian Games medalists in swimming
Southeast Asian Games gold medalists for Vietnam
Southeast Asian Games bronze medalists for Vietnam
Competitors at the 2009 Southeast Asian Games
Competitors at the 2011 Southeast Asian Games
Competitors at the 2013 Southeast Asian Games
Competitors at the 2015 Southeast Asian Games
Asian Games competitors for Vietnam
Competitors at the 2019 Southeast Asian Games
Competitors at the 2021 Southeast Asian Games
20th-century Vietnamese people
21st-century Vietnamese people